The 2023 Calgary Stampeders season is scheduled to be the 65th season for the team in the Canadian Football League and their 78th overall. The Stampeders will attempt to qualify for the playoffs for the 18th straight year and win the ninth Grey Cup championship in franchise history. The 2023 CFL season is scheduled to be Dave Dickenson's seventh season as head coach and first as general manager following his promotion.

Offseason

CFL Global Draft
The 2023 CFL Global Draft is scheduled to take place on May 2, 2023. If the same format as the 2022 CFL Global Draft is used, the Stampeders will have three selections in the draft with the sixth-best odds to win the weighted draft lottery.

CFL National Draft
The 2023 CFL Draft is scheduled to take place on May 2, 2023. The Stampeders currently have eight selections in the eight-round draft after forfeiting their second round pick after selecting T. J. Rayam in the 2022 Supplemental Draft and trading their seventh-round pick to the Roughriders in exchange for James Smith. However, the team swapped their first-round pick and acquired additional third-round picks and sixth-round picks after trading Bo Levi Mitchell to the Hamilton Tiger-Cats.

The Stampeders are scheduled to have the sixth selection in each of the eight rounds of the draft after losing the West Semi-Final and finishing third in the 2022 league standings, not including traded picks.

Preseason

Schedule

Regular season

Standings

Schedule

Team

Roster

Coaching staff

References

External links
 

Calgary Stampeders seasons
2023 Canadian Football League season by team
2023 in Alberta